The Abbey of Montesanto or Abbazia di Santa Maria in Montesanto is Romanesque-style Benedictine monastery located in the rural hills outside the town of Civitella del Tronto, in the province of Teramo, Abruzzo, Italy.

History
This former Benedictine abbey and church was said to have been founded in 542 by St Benedict himself, on his return from Ascoli Piceno. The first documentation of its existence is from 1064. Located at the boundary of the Papal and Neapolitan states, the monastery once had been rich in land and church benefices, however by the 1400s, had fallen in importance and underwent definitive suppression in 1797.

The abbey church was originally a single nave, but a reconstruction in 13th century changed it to three naves. The Romanesque bell tower is separate from the church and located in the monastery.

See also
Catholic Church in Italy

References

13th-century Roman Catholic church buildings in Italy
Romanesque architecture in Abruzzo
Churches in the province of Teramo
Benedictine monasteries in Italy